Tickles was a small settlement with seven families. It is located in the Placentia and St. Mary's District. It had a population of 61 in 1951 and 58 in 1956.

See also
List of communities in Newfoundland and Labrador

Populated coastal places in Canada
Populated places in Newfoundland and Labrador